The opening ceremony of the 1992 Winter Olympics took place at Théâtre des Cérémonies in Albertville, France, on 8 February 1992.

Ceremony
It is themed around an innovative way for a theater.

Opening

Parade of Nations 

The flag bearers of 64 National Olympic Committees entered the stadium informally in single file, ordered by the French alphabet, and behind them marched the athletes with any distinction or grouping by nationality.

Opening
OCOA President Jean-Claude Killy delivered a speech in French, welcoming everyone. IOC President Juan Antonio Samaranch delivered a speech in French and the President of France François Mitterrand declared the Games of the XVI Winter Olympiad in Albertville opened.

Anthems
 Olympic Hymn
 Séverine du Peloux - National Anthem of France

TV coverage

References

opening ceremony
Ceremonies in France
Olympics opening ceremonies